HMS Edinburgh was a 74-gun third rate ship of the line of the Royal Navy, launched on 26 November 1811 at Rotherhithe.

Between 1837 and 1841 she served in the Mediterranean, including operations off the coast of Syria and Lebanon in the Syrian War. In 1846 she was taken in hand at Portsmouth Dockyard and converted to steam-powered screw propulsion as a 'blockship'. The conversion was completed on 19 August 1852. In this transformation her displacement was increased to 2,598 tons and her complement of guns reduced to 60 (or 56: reports differ). She acted as guard ship for Devonport until February 1854, when she was assigned to the fleet sent to the Baltic under Sir Charles Napier. She was the flagship of Rear-Admiral Henry Ducie Chads, third in command of the fleet, and took part in the bombardment and capture of the Russian fortress of Bomarsund on Åland. She returned to the Baltic in 1855. Subsequently she was a guard ship at Sheerness and at Leith, and was sold out of the Navy for breaking up in 1866.

Notes

References

Lavery, Brian (2003) The Ship of the Line - Volume 1: The development of the battlefleet 1650-1850. Conway Maritime Press. .

External links
 

Ships of the line of the Royal Navy
Vengeur-class ships of the line
Ships built in Rotherhithe
1811 ships
Crimean War naval ships of the United Kingdom